Malyk Hamilton (born September 2, 1999) is a Canadian professional soccer player who most recently played for North Carolina FC of USL League One.

Club career

Early career 
Hamilton began playing soccer in Calgary with Calgary Northern Hills, before moving on to Calgary Deerfoot and then Calgary Southwest United.

West Ham United 
Hamilton joined the West Ham United Academy at the U-12 level and made 25 appearances in the U-18 Premier League. He also made a brief appearance in the Premier League 2.

In March 2018, Hamilton left West Ham.

Toronto FC II 
Shortly after leaving West Ham, Hamilton signed with Toronto FC II. On December 20, 2018 Hamilton was released by Toronto FC.

Cavalry FC 
On March 6, 2019 Hamilton signed with his hometown Canadian Premier League club Cavalry FC. Hamilton would not be listed on Cavalry's training camp roster for the 2020 season, ending his time with the club after one season.

Atlético Ottawa 
On March 6, 2020, Hamilton signed with Atlético Ottawa. He made his debut on August 15 against York9. In the shortened 2020 season, he played in every single minute of action for the club.

North Carolina FC 
On February 22, 2021, Hamilton signed with North Carolina FC of USL League One. Upon completion of the 2021 season, North Carolina would announce that Hamilton's option would not be picked up, making him a free agent.

International career 
In October 2016, Hamilton made his debut and scored in a Canada U18 game, led by Rob Gale.

Personal life 
Hamilton was born in Calgary, Alberta. He is a cousin of English professional footballers Marvin Bartley and Mitchell Thomas.

Honours
Calvary FC 
 Canadian Premier League Finals 
Runners-up: 2019
Canadian Premier League (Regular season): 
Champions: Spring 2019, Fall 2019

References

External links 

1999 births
Living people
Association football defenders
Canadian soccer players
Soccer players from Calgary
Black Canadian soccer players
Canadian expatriate soccer players
Expatriate footballers in England
Canadian expatriate sportspeople in England
West Ham United F.C. players
Toronto FC players
Toronto FC II players
Cavalry FC players
Atlético Ottawa players
North Carolina FC players
League1 Ontario players
USL Championship players
Canadian Premier League players